FC Porto became the 12th club to win multiple European Cup/Champions League titles in a fairytale 2003–04 season. For the first time since 1995, a club outside the big four leagues won the trophy, and it was widely attributed to charismatic coach José Mourinho. The title was clinched in an emphatic 3–0 victory against Monaco in the final in Gelsenkirchen.

Following the success, Mourinho departed the club for Chelsea, bringing key defenders Paulo Ferreira and Ricardo Carvalho with him. Playmaker Deco also departed, in his case for Barcelona. Elsewhere, it got to keep midfield duo Maniche and Costinha intact, and strikers Derlei and Benni McCarthy stayed at the club.

Squad
Squad at end of season

Out on loan

Results

Supertaça Cândido de Oliveira

UEFA Super Cup

Primeira Liga

Matches

Taça de Portugal

Knockout stage

Final

UEFA Champions League

Group stage

Knockout stage 

Round of 16
Quarter-finals
Semi-finals

Final

Top scorers

Primeira Liga
  Benni McCarthy 20
  Derlei 13
  Maniche 6

References

Porto
2004
UEFA Champions League-winning seasons
Portuguese football championship-winning seasons